Aspergillus anthodesmis is a species of fungus in the genus Aspergillus. It is from the Sparsi section. The species was first described in 1979. It has been reported to produce gregatins.

Growth and morphology

A. anthodesmis has been cultivated on both Czapek yeast extract agar (CYA) plates and Malt Extract Agar Oxoid® (MEAOX) plates. The growth morphology of the colonies can be seen in the pictures below.

References 

anthodesmis
Fungi described in 1994